Wiset Chai Chan is a district (amphoe) in the southwestern part of Ang Thong province, central Thailand.

History
When King Naresuan the Great defeated the Burmese troops at Don Chedi, he led his troops past Phai Cham Sin. He saw the strategic potential of the area with the Noi River as a natural obstacle for the Burmese troops. Thus he established Mueang Wiset Chai Chan there.

In the Rattanakosin era, the Noi River had become shallow and was no longer navigable for water transportation. The government thus moved the central tambon of the mueang to Bang Kaeo, on the Chao Phraya River bank and called the new area Ang Thong. At the same time, they downgraded the district to Phai Cham Sin District. King Chulalongkorn (Rama V) ordered the district to assume its historical name, Wiset Chai Chan. In 1979 the office district was moved to the Pho Phraya-Tha Rua Road in Tambon San Chao Rong Thong.

Geography
Neighboring districts are (from the north clockwise) Samko, Pho Thong, Mueang Ang Thong, and Pa Mok of Ang Thong Province; Phak Hai of Ayutthaya province and Mueang Suphanburi; and Si Prachan of Suphanburi province.

Administration
The district is divided into 15 sub-districts (tambons). There are two townships (thesaban tambons) within the district. San Chao Rong Thong covers parts of tambons San Chao Rong Thong and Phai Cham Sin, and Bang Chak covers parts of the tambons Bang Chak, Khlong Khanak, and Si Roi.

Wiset Chai Chan